The 2013 Southern Thailand bombings were a series of bombings that took place in Danok, Padang Besar and Sadao, Songkhla Province, Thailand near the Malaysian border on 22 December 2013.

Attacks 
The first explosion occurred around 10:30 and 10:40 in the morning when a bomb placed on a motorcycle exploded in front of the Padang Besar police station on the Thai side of the border. No one was injured in the blast

The second bomb exploded at about the same time. It was also placed on a motorcycle and went off in front of the Sadao police station. Also no one was injured.

The third bomb went off in front of the Oliver Hotel in Danok. It was placed in a car and activated with a digital watch. The explosions also resulted in a fire, which destroyed the business premises, several vehicles as well as a part of the hotel.

The fourth bomb was set off in front of a shop in Bukit Kayu Hitam on the Thai side of the border.

The bombings were similar to the one in Hatyai at the Lee Gardens Plaza Hotel on 31 March 2012 where three people, including two Malaysians, were killed.

References

See also 
 
 2012 Southern Thailand bombings

South Thailand insurgency
Terrorist incidents in Thailand in 2013
Songkhla province
Car and truck bombings in Asia
Improvised explosive device bombings in Thailand
Islamic terrorism in Thailand
Religiously motivated violence in Thailand
2013 crimes in Thailand
December 2013 events in Thailand